Jorge Enrique Arias De la Hoz (born 13 November 1992) is a Colombian professional footballer who plays as a central defender for Atlético Junior.

Honours

Club
Olimpia Asunción
 2018 Clausura, 2019 Apertura, 2019 Clausura,2020 Clausura

External links
 

Living people
1992 births
Colombian footballers
Association football defenders
Valledupar F.C. footballers
Independiente Medellín footballers
Atlético Junior footballers
Club Olimpia footballers
Deportivo Cali footballers
Categoría Primera A players
Categoría Primera B players
Paraguayan Primera División players
Colombian expatriate footballers
Colombian expatriate sportspeople in Paraguay
Expatriate footballers in Paraguay
People from Valledupar